Call the Mesquiteers (also released as Outlaws of the West) is a 1938 American Western "Three Mesquiteers" B-movie directed by John English.

Cast 
 Robert Livingston as Stony Brooke
 Ray Corrigan as Tucson Smith
 Max Terhune as Lullaby Joslin
 Lynne Roberts as Madge Irving (as Lynn Roberts)
 Earle Hodgins as Dr. Algemon Irving
 Sammy McKim as Timothy Irving
 Eddy Waller as Hardy
 Maston Williams as Phillips
 Eddie Hart as Henchman 'Lefty'
 Pat Gleason as Henchman Joe
 Roger Williams as Henchman Frank
 Warren Jackson as Henchman 'Mac'
 Hal Price as Sheriff Jed Benton

References

External links 

1938 films
1938 Western (genre) films
American black-and-white films
American Western (genre) films
Films directed by John English
Republic Pictures films
Three Mesquiteers films
1930s English-language films
1930s American films